The Delhi Airport Express Line or Orange Line is a Delhi Metro line from New Delhi Metro Station to Dwarka Sector 21, linking Indira Gandhi International Airport. The total length of the line is 22.7 km, of which 15.7 km is underground and 7 km, from Buddha Jayanti Park to Mahipalpur, is elevated.

On 27 June 2013 Reliance Infrastructure Ltd. announced to DMRC that they are unable to operate the line beyond 30 June 2013. Following this, DMRC took over operations of Airport Express line from 1 July 2013 with an operations and maintenance team of 100 officials to handle the line.

The line runs at a speed of 80 km/h providing for a 19-minute journey from New Delhi to  IGI Airport.

History

The first tenders for line construction were awarded in September 2007. On 23 January 2008, the DMRC awarded a 30-year build-operate-transfer PPP contract to the Reliance Energy-CAF consortium. However, DMRC paid for half of the construction cost and executed tunneling and civil works.

It was built at a cost of  57 billion, of which Reliance Infra paid  28.85 billion (U$580m), Reliance Infra will also pay fees on a Revenue-share model

The elevated section of the Airport Express Line was built over eight busy roads which carry a heavy volume of traffic, including the Ring Road, National Highway 48, Ridge Road and Sardar Patel Marg.

Originally scheduled to open by 31 August 2010, well in time for the 2010 Commonwealth Games, the line finally opened on 23 February 2011 at 2 pm after missing four previously set deadlines. The DMRC fined Reliance Infra  37.5 lakh every day from 30 September, and  75 lakh every day from 31 October for repeatedly missing the deadlines. The Aerocity and Dhaula Kuan stations opened on 15 August 2011.

Services were suspended on 8 July 2012 due to a series of technical problems, including cracks in the girders, the iron beams that support the tracks; dislocated bearings that support the train; defective tracks and water seepage in tunnels. The Urban Development Ministry subsequently disclosed that several clips in the underground section have been seriously damaged and it will take at least 5 months to rectify the problem. A joint inspection by Delhi Metro and Reliance Infrastructure team has revealed that 540 bearings need rectification and some girders which have cracked also need to be recast.

The line reopened on 23 January 2013, operating at a reduced speed of 50 km/h. At the reduced speed the time travel from New Delhi Metro Station to Airport was around 40–50 minutes. After inspection by the DMRC and various other experts, in mid-2014, DMRC reinstated 80 km/hr speeds on the line.

At the original speed of 80 km/h, the journey from New Delhi Metro Station to Airport takes just 20 minutes. 

In 2022, the DMRC decided to increase the operating speed from 80 km/h to 120 km/h by 2023 reducing travel time from the current 20 minutes to less than 15 minutes.

Map

Stations

All the six metro stations on the line are known as City Airport Terminals (CATs). They are fitted with state-of-the-art gadgets like explosive detectors, large x-ray baggage scanners, under vehicle scanners, quick reaction teams and dog squads to ensure full security of commuters and baggage alike. The stations have full-height platform screen doors to prevent untoward incidents and to provide better air conditioning. All the stations are secured with a network of CCTV cameras which relays live images to the station control room, security control room and operations control centre. The security of the airport line is handled by Central Industrial Security Force who also handles the safety of all the stations of DMRC.

All the stations are disabled friendly so that people on wheelchairs can access them with facilities such as stations with ramps having a mild slope leading to elevators, the elevators are specially designed for the convenience of physically challenged people and capable of carrying stretchers, help call points are located at various points of stations and trains so that in case of any emergency, a disabled person can seek help by just pressing the call buttons. The elevators can be used by visually impaired persons with the elevator buttons having Braille letters.

Operations
While it was initially planned to run trains 24 hours a day with a frequency of 10 minutes, train services, operate from 4:45 am to 11:30 pm, with a 15-minute frequency.

While originally expected to carry 42,000 people daily by 2011 as per detailed project report prepared by DMRC, actual ridership has hovered around 20,000. Within a few years, due to several initiative and fare reduction by the DMRC, ridership crossed 50,000 per day.

Fare
There are also passes available for 30 and 45 trips costing  and  respectively for travelling from New Delhi to IGI Airport. There are other such passes available for different origin destination combinations. Stored Value cards are also on offer which will give 10% discount on all the trips. These airport express fares are cheaper than any other modes of transport to reach airport.

Infrastructure 
Siemens Mobility is providing signalling, power transmission, and baggage handling system enabling passengers to check in with baggage at the New Delhi metro station and Shivaji Stadium, with 1200 passengers per hour capacity. The €34 million project was expected to be completed by 2010 in time for the Commonwealth games but it did not manage to meet the deadline. Alcatel is supplying the communications systems. Indra Sistemas is providing the ticket machines. Faiveley is providing the platform screen doors. Bluestar and Honeywell is the control and automation provider for Station Management System (SMS). Bluestar is the main BEMS system provider.

The line will be the first line in the country to be mapped on Geographic Information System to enhance safety, maintenance and traffic regulation and will help in mobilising emergency services in case of an accident. In April 2020, DMRC published a notice for procuring a SCADA System at the line's Operational Control Centre (OCC)

Rolling stock 

Eight six-car trains supplied by CAF Beasain were imported from Spain. CAF holds 5% equity in the DAME project and Reliance Infrastructure holds the remaining 95%. The trains on this line are of a premium standard and have in-built noise reduction features for a noise-free ride with padded fabric seats. The coaches are equipped with LCD screens for entertainment of the passengers and also provide flight information for convenience of air travellers. The trains are fitted with an event recorder which can withstand high levels of temperature and impact and the wheels have flange lubrication system for less noise and better riding comfort.

Based on the consultancy by MTR, the interior design of the rolling stock is highly similar to that of Hong Kong's Airport Express line, which uses very similar trains.

Tracks 
To ensure safety, the tracks are fitted with RHEDA-2000 signalling technology, which theoretically allows trains to travel at up to 350 km/h (nearly three times the actual maximum speed of current trains). The entire 22.7 km route is ballast-less track, which costs 40–50% more than normal train tracks, but does not take longer to lay than traditional tracks. The rails rest on rubber pads on the concrete sleepers for less noise.

The 7 km elevated section from Buddha Jayanti Park to Mahipalpur has been built with 25 m long girders for the first time in India. The 504 girders weigh 120 tons each and were cast in Mahipalpur and transported on 35 m long trailers with 64 tyres.

Check-in and cloak room facility
The line has the first check in facility outside an airport in South Asia.

Passengers flying with Air India and Vistara which use T3 terminal as base of operations can check in at the New Delhi Metro Station. The check-in can be done anytime before 6 hours to 2 and half hours before departure time. Passengers flying for international flights also started checking in as this facility from 22 February 2012.

Cloak room facilities are available as well, with rates beginning at Rs 50 for the first 4 hours for luggage weighing less than 20 kilograms, to Rs 350 for 24 hours for luggage weighing more than 30 kilograms.

Smartphone as ticket
Delhi Metro Rail Corporation has introduced QR code-based ticketing facility for travel on Airport Express Line from September 2018. The system will enable passengers to purchase tickets using 'Ridlr mobile App' without physically coming to the metro station. Airport Line stations even have QR-enabled entry and exit gates for commuters.

WiFi service
The Airport Express line introduced WiFi services at all six stations along the route on 13 January 2012. It was the first line of the Delhi Metro to provide WiFi services. Connectivity inside metro trains travelling on the route is expected in the future. The WiFi service is provided by YOU Broadband India Limited.

Post office
The post office will have all basic postal services like speed post, e-post, express parcel, registered post, postal stamps and revenue stamps on all working days from 10 am to 4 pm.

Postal services can be availed by both commuters and non-commuters as the counter is located at the non-paid area of New Delhi metro station's concourse level.

Abhishek Bachchan, along with co-stars Sonam Kapoor and Neil Nitin Mukesh headed to the Airport line to promote his movie "Players" in Delhi, and also attempted to break a safe while travelling from one station of the Airport line to another.
 SRK for 'Ra.One' - Airport Express
 SRK, Priyanka Chopra, Farhan Akhtar, Ritesh Sidhwani for 'Don 2' - Airport Express New Delhi Station
 Manoj Bajpayee, Tia Bajpai and Maqbool Khan for 'Lanka' - Airport Express line
 Emraan Hashmi for 'The Dirty Picture' - Rajiv Chowk metro station
 Star cast of 'Players' - Airport Express Line

 Shootings
 'Jannat 2' - Shivaji Stadium metro station
 'Kismat Love Paisa Dilli'- Shivaji Stadium metro station
  Tamil Film 'Thaandavam' - Shivaji Stadium metro station

See also 
Transport in Delhi
Delhi Suburban Railway
Hyderabad Airport Express Metro
ORR-Airport Metro Line
Airport Express (MTR)

References

External links 

 Delhi Airport Metro Express Line
 Delhi Metro Airport Rail Images & Information
 Delhi Metro Rail Corporation Ltd. (Official site) 
 
 UrbanRail.Net – descriptions of all metro systems in the world, each with a schematic map showing all stations.

Delhi Metro lines
Airport rail links in India
Railway lines opened in 2011